Kevin John Betson (12 November 1929 – 29 December 2012) was an Australian rules footballer who played with Richmond in the Victorian Football League (VFL).

Notes

External links 		
		
		
Tigerland Archive

1929 births
2012 deaths		
Australian rules footballers from Victoria (Australia)		
Richmond Football Club players
Echuca Football Club players